Otok is a town in eastern Croatia, located 20 km south of Vinkovci, in eastern Slavonia. The settlement gained the status of town by the decision of the Parliament of Croatia on July 13, 2006. At the time, nearby Privlaka was a part of the municipality, but was subsequently declared a municipality in its own right. The population of the town of Otok is 6,343 (census 2011), with 4,694 residents in Otok itself and 1,649 in the nearby village of Komletinci. In the census of 2011, 99.31% of the population declared themselves Croats.

References

External links

Cities and towns in Croatia
Populated places in Vukovar-Syrmia County
Populated places in Syrmia